John Barry Larson (born July 22, 1948) is an American politician and businessman serving as the U.S. representative for  since 1999. The district is based in the state capital, Hartford. A member of the Democratic Party, Larson chaired the House Democratic Caucus during the 111th and 112th United States Congress.

Early life, education, and career
Larson was born in Hartford, but has spent most of his life in nearby East Hartford. He grew up in a public housing project. He was educated at East Hartford High School and Central Connecticut State University. He worked as a high school history teacher and an assistant athletics coach at George J. Penney High School (Penney High later merged with East Hartford High School).

Larson began his career as the co-owner of an insurance agency in East Hartford before entering public service. In 1971, he was selected as a Senior Fellow to the Yale University Bush Center in Child Development and Social Policy by Head Start Program founder Edward Zigler. He transitioned into politics in 1977, when he served one term on the East Hartford Board of Education. He then served two terms on the East Hartford Town Council.

In 1982, Larson was elected to the Connecticut Senate from the 3rd district, based in East Hartford. He served six terms in that body, the last four as president pro tempore.

U.S. House of Representatives

Elections
In 1994, Larson left the state senate and sought the Democratic nomination for governor of Connecticut, losing to Bill Curry in the primary. After being defeated for governor, Larson entered private business for several years but was able to maintain his political credentials.

Due in part to service in the Democratic Party and his local connections in the state, he narrowly defeated Secretary of State Miles S. Rapoport in the Democratic primary for the 1st district when 17-year incumbent Barbara Kennelly gave up the seat to run for governor in 1998. The 1st has long been the most Democratic district in Connecticut, and Larson's victory in November was a foregone conclusion. He has been reelected eleven times with no substantive opposition.

On February 1, 2006, Larson was elected vice chair of the House Democratic Caucus. The previous vice chair, Jim Clyburn, became chair when Bob Menendez was appointed to the United States Senate. After the Democrats won control of Congress in the 2006 elections, Larson opted not to run for caucus chair—a post that went to former Democratic Congressional Campaign Committee chair Rahm Emanuel—instead running unopposed for reelection as vice chair. After being reelected in 2008, Larson was elected chair of the caucus for the 111th Congress, after Emanuel was named White House Chief of Staff.

Tenure

Energy and the environment
Larson has introduced various pieces of legislation in attempts to nationalize the US's energy and to reduce greenhouse gas emissions in order to protect the environment. He cosponsored the Energy Independence and Security Act of 2007 "to move the United States toward greater energy independence and security, to increase the production of clean renewable fuels, to protect consumers, to increase the efficiency of products, buildings, and vehicles, to promote research on and deploy greenhouse gas capture and storage options, and to improve the energy performance of the Federal Government, and for other purposes." According to Larson, "I have become convinced of the need for comprehensive legislation to reduce the amount of greenhouse gases we are emitting into the environment." His stances on environmental protection have earned him a rating of 100% with the League of Conservation Voters.

Economic issues
In 2010 Larson introduced the Small Business Jobs Act of 2010, authorizing the creation of the Small Business Lending Fund Program administered by the Treasury Department to make capital investments in eligible institutions, in order to increase the availability of credit for small businesses. Larson was a strong advocate for the American Recovery and Reinvestment Act of 2009, which increased federal spending in infrastructure, education, health and energy while expanding some welfare and social security programs. His liberal stance on government spending has earned him a rating of 9% with Citizens Against Government Waste, a conservative anti-government spending interest group.

Larson received media attention for scolding members of Congress for shutting down the government on September 30, 2013.

Social issues
Larson has consistently voted both to legalize same-sex marriage and to expand options for legal abortion. He voted to repeal the military's "don't ask, don't tell" policy, and in favor of the Sexual Orientation Employment Nondiscrimination Act (ENDA). The Human Rights Campaign gave Larson a rating of 94%. Larson voted not to end federal funding to Planned Parenthood. Planned Parenthood and NARAL Pro-Choice American both gave him a rating of 100%.

Committee assignments
Committee on Ways and Means
Subcommittee on Social Security (chair)
Subcommittee on Select Revenue Measures

Caucus memberships
Congressional Shellfish Caucus (co-chair)
House Hydrogen and Fuel Cell Coalition (co-chair)
House Baltic Caucus
Congressional Arts Caucus
Afterschool Caucuses
Congressional NextGen 9-1-1 Caucus
United States Congressional International Conservation Caucus
Climate Solutions Caucus
Blue Collar Caucus

Personal life
Larson is married to Leslie Best. They have three children and reside in East Hartford.

References

External links

Congressman John B. Larson official U.S. House website
John B. Larson for Congress

1948 births
20th-century American politicians
21st-century American politicians
Schoolteachers from Connecticut
Central Connecticut State University alumni
Democratic Party Connecticut state senators
Democratic Party members of the United States House of Representatives from Connecticut
Living people
Presidents pro tempore of the Connecticut Senate
People from East Hartford, Connecticut